Ebony Obsidian (born April 16, 1994) is an American actress. She had supporting role in the 2018 drama film If Beale Street Could Talk and the following year began starring as Karen Mott in the BET comedy-drama series, Sistas.

Life and career
Obsidian was born and raised in New Paltz, New York. She is of Eritrean Habesha descent and trained at the William Esper Studio. While there she began acting in independent films, including The Vixens and Where Hearts Lie opposite Malik Yoba and Clifton Powell. In 2015, Obsidian starred in Tough Love, a web series that aired on YouTube. In 2018, Obsidian co-starred in the drama film If Beale Street Could Talk, playing the lead character's sister.

In 2019, Obsidian co-starred in the Hulu  limited series Wu-Tang: An American Saga. Later that year, she began starring in the BET comedy-drama series, Sistas. In 2020, she had a recurring role as Carol Hawthorne in the Amazon drama series Hunters.

In 2023, Obsidian was cast opposite Kerry Washington, Susan Sarandon and Oprah Winfrey in the war drama film, Six Triple Eight for Netflix.

Filmography

Film

Television

References

External links

Living people
1994 births
21st-century American actresses
Actresses from New York (state)
African-American actresses
American film actresses
American people of Eritrean descent
American television actresses
People from New Paltz, New York
21st-century African-American women
21st-century African-American people